Acrotome is a genus of plants in the family Lamiaceae, first described in 1838. The genus is native to the southern part of Africa.

Species
Acrotome angustifolia G.Taylor - Zambabwe, Botswana, Namibia, Cape Province, Transvaal 
Acrotome fleckii (Gürke) Launert - Namibia
Acrotome hispida Benth. - KwaZulu-Natal, Eswatini, Transvaal
Acrotome inflata Benth. - South Africa, Angola, Zambia, Zimbabwe, Namibia, Botswana, Lesotho 
Acrotome mozambiquensis G.Taylor - Mozambique
Acrotome pallescens Benth.  - Namibia, Cape Province
Acrotome tenuis G.Taylor - Zambia
Acrotome thorncroftii Skan - KwaZulu-Natal, Eswatini, Transvaal, Mozambique

References

Lamiaceae
Lamiaceae genera